Bhago is a village of Kharian Tehsil, Gujrat District in the Punjab province of Pakistan. It is located at 32°44'0N 73°49'0E with an altitude of 240 metres (790 feet), and is situated near the Dinga Road about 10 miles away from the city of Kharian.
The population of the village is about 5,000, most of inhabitants rely on foreign remittances and agriculture as their occupation and the main crop is wheat. This village has 4 roads attached in other villages. Two of them are accessible from Dinga Road. Bhago village has three Mosques, PTCL exchange, School for boys and girls and government hospital. 

Ex Chairman of Lalamusa Municipal Committee and a Basic Democratic Member in the regime of President Ayub Khan, Sheikh Ghulam Sarwar(1924-1984) belonged to this village.

References

Populated places in Gujrat District

pl:Mangla
pt:Mangla